Grosvenor Group Limited is an internationally diversified property group, which traces its origins to 1677 and has its headquarters in London, England. It has a global reach, now in 62 international cities, with offices in 14 of them, operated on behalf of its owners, the Duke of Westminster and his family. It has four regional development and investment businesses (Britain and Ireland, the Americas, Europe, and Asia Pacific) and a portfolio of indirect investments. Its sectors include residential, office, retail, industrial, along with hotels.

Grosvenor Estate
The history of the Grosvenor Estate begins in 1677, with the marriage of the heiress Mary Davies to Sir Thomas Grosvenor, 3rd Baronet (1655–1700). Mary had inherited the manor of Ebury, 500 acres of land north of the Thames to the west of the City of London. This area remained largely untouched by the Grosvenors until the 1720s, when they developed the northern part, now known as Mayfair, around Grosvenor Square. A few generations later, in the 1820s, their focus moved south, to what is now Belgravia, developing Eaton Square, Chester Square, and other famous addresses. Later in the 19th century, the area of Pimlico was developed; this was sold in 1953.

Nomenclature
Many of the streets within the estate are named after the Grosvenor family and its connections. The Grosvenor family became established in England before the 15th century, on the manor of Eaton in Cheshire, where is still located its principal seat, Eaton Hall. Many of the family's early members sat as one of the two Members of Parliament for Chester.

In 1874, Hugh Grosvenor was created Duke of Westminster; other titles held by the current duke are: Marquess of Westminster, Earl Grosvenor, Viscount Belgrave, and Baron Grosvenor.  The title of Baron Ebury was granted in 1857 to the 3rd son of the 1st Marquess of Westminster, after the name of the original manor of Ebury (whence Ebury Street, etc. in Pimlico), and the 2nd son of the 1st Marquess succeeded his maternal grandfather under special remainder in 1814 to the title of Earl of Wilton (whence Wilton Crescent etc. in Belgravia). "The Cheshire villages of Lupus, Eccleston and Belgrave, within or near the family estate, are recognised in street names of the London estate."

Buildings
The Mayfair portion of the estate includes Peabody social housing around Brown Hart Gardens.

International expansion
Although the Grosvenor Group is often identified with its core asset, the Grosvenor Estate in London, which is now managed within Grosvenor Britain & Ireland, the present-day investment and development portfolio is now also in other parts of Britain and Ireland.  International expansion began in the 1950s, in Canada, and later in the United States, hence businesses in the Americas.

In the 1960s, the businesses expanded into Australia and, in the 1990s, into Asia Pacific. Also in the 1990s, Grosvenor expanded into Continental Europe, where most current activity relates to Grosvenor's fund management business. This was formally established in 2005 and now encompasses the Americas, Asia Pacific (including Australia), and Europe (including the UK).

Properties owned by Grosvenor
Properties in the UK, Continental Europe, Asia, and the Americas include:
Liverpool One, a shopping district in Liverpool, UK
District, an urban mixed-use residential and retail development in Washington, D.C., United States
Century Plaza II, a 99,126 sq ft class A office building in Silicon Valley, California, United States
Waterstone Apartment Homes, a 432-unit community in Silicon Valley, San Jose, California, United States
240 Stockton Street, a ten-storey luxury retail and office building located in San Francisco, California, United States
875 California Street, a condominium building in San Francisco, California, United States
288 Pacific, a retail in Jackson Square, San Francisco, California, United States
394 Pacific Avenue, an office building located in San Francisco, California, United States
1645 Pacific Avenue, a luxury condominium building in San Francisco, California, United States
185 Post Street, a luxury shopping centre in San Francisco, California, United States
Grosvenor Ambleside, a waterfront community and shopping district in Vancouver, British Columbia, Canada
Connaught, a luxury village in Vancouver, British Columbia, Canada
The RISE, a luxury apartment building and shopping mall in Vancouver, British Columbia, Canada
Drake, a collection of 135 condominiums and townhomes in Calgary, Alberta, Canada
Haninge Centrum, a shopping mall in Stockholm, Sweden
Väsby Centrum, a shopping mall in Stockholm, Sweden
Burlöv Centrum, a shopping mall in Malmö, Sweden
Rue de la Republique, a community and shopping district in Lyon, France
Rue Serpenoise, a shopping retail complex buildings in Metz, France
The Westminster Terrace, a 59 floors luxury apartment building in Hong Kong
China Merchants Tower, an office building in Beijing, China
Parkside Plaza, a shopping mall in Shanghai, China
Grosvenor Place Kamizono-cho, a luxury residential development in Tokyo, Japan
The Westminster Roppongi, a luxury apartment building in Tokyo, Japan
The Westminster Nanpeidai, a luxury condominium building in Shibuya, Tokyo, Japan
F1RST, an urban mixed-use residential and retail development across the street from Nationals Park in Washington, D.C.
Central, an award-winning mixed-use apartment building in Silver Spring, MD

See also
Other large privately owned historic estates in London include:
Bedford Estate (Bloomsbury)
Cadogan Estates (Chelsea)
Howard de Walden Estate (Marylebone)
Kingston House Estate (Knightsbridge)
Pettiward Estate (Putney and West Brompton)
Portman Estate (Marylebone)
Smith's Charity Estate (South Kensington)

References

External links
Grosvenor Group — official website
Grosvenor Group – Report Archive
Grosvenor Group Environment Review
Grosvenor Estate  — parent company of Grosvenor Group

Mayfair
Property companies of the United Kingdom
Privately held companies based in London
Privately owned estates in London
Family-owned companies of the United Kingdom